Anubanini, also Anobanini (: An-nu-ba-ni-ni), was a king (𒈗 Šàr, pronounced Shar) of the pre-Iranian tribal kingdom of Lullubi in the Zagros Mountains circa 2300 BCE, or relatively later during the Isin-Larsa period  of Mesopotamia, circa 2000-1900 BCE. He is known especially from the Anubanini rock relief, located in Kermanshah Province, Iran.

According to an inscription, Annubanini seems to have been contemporary with Simurrum king Iddin-Sin. Another well-known Lullubi king is Satuni, who was vanquished by the Mesopotamian king Naram-Sin circa 2250 BCE.

Anubanini rock relief

In this rock relief, Anubanini, the king of the Lullubi, puts his foot on the chest of a captive. There are 8 other captives, two of them kneeled behind the Lullubian equivalent of the Akkadian goddess Ishtar (recognisable by the four pairs of horns on her headdress and the weapons over her shoulders) and six of them standing in a lower row at the bottom of the rock relief. He is faced by goddess Nini/Innana/Ishtar, and it is thought that he may have claimed divinity, like several rulers after the end of the Third Dynasty of Ur.

This rock relief is very similar to the Behistun Inscription and may have influenced it.

In the inscription in Akkadian script and language, he declares himself as the mighty king of Lullubium, who had set up his image as well as that of Ishtar on mount Batir, and calls on various deities to preserve his monument:

Raids on Guthium, Elam, and Babylonian territory
 

Some later legends, such as the Cuthean Legend of Naram-Sin, describe a king Anubanini during the reign of Naram-Sin (c. 2254–2218 BCE), who used to raid the fertile lands of the Babylonian plain from his mountain territory on the eastern frontier. The epic Cuthean Legend of Naram-Sin claims Gutium and Elam among the lands raided by the hordes led by Anubanini. According to this account Anubanini was only stopped at the shores of the Persian Gulf.

Depictions

References 

Middle Eastern monarchs
23rd-century BC monarchs